More Than Words is the thirteenth studio album by American singer Brian McKnight. It was released by E1 Music on March 19, 2013 in the United States. Entirely produced by McKnight himself, the album features contribution from singer Colbie Caillat as well as his two sons Niko and Brian McKnight Jr. More Than Words debuted and peaked at number seven on the US Billboard Top R&B/Hip-Hop Albums chart, selling 7,000 copies in its first week. As of August 2016, it has sold 26,000 copies in the US. The album features the singles "Sweeter" and "4th of July."

Critical reception

In his review for Allmusic, editor Andy Kellman noted that More Than Words "is filled with references to late-'70s and early-'80s R&B and soft rock" and called it "McKnight's most enjoyable album since 2006's Ten." Mikael Wood from  Los Angeles Times wrote that the album "is great. Really great. So great that unless D’Angelo gets around to completing his long-awaited return to music, it might end up the best R&B; album of the year [...] McKnight on the overlooked More Than Words simply feels like a lover of the game, a champion minus his title."

Brendon Veevers from  Renowned for Sound called the album "a nice release", but reacted critical to "the disappointing collaboration between McKnight and Collait", while feeling "that the up-tempo hits are too few and far between [...] Nonetheless the exemption of a few dance floor hits and the disappointment of the missing vocal duet doesn’t take away the fact that More Than Words is a remarkable record overflowing with the smooth groves and charming songwriting brilliance of an R&B master." SoulTracks editor Melody Charles found that "More Than Words Musiq-esque titles, overlywhelmingly 'safe' selections and growing preoccupation with the freaky-deaky seem to signal that McKnight needs to take than a couple of years away in order to preserve his lofty status."

Track listing 
All tracks are produced by Brian McKnight.

Charts

References

2013 albums
Albums produced by Brian McKnight
Brian McKnight albums
E1 Music albums